Leyla Güngör (born May 29, 1993) is a Turkish international women's footballer who plays as a defender in the Swedish Damallsvenskan for FC Rosengård. She is a member of the Turkish national team.

Early life
Leyla Güngör was born on May 29, 1993, in Malmö, Sweden to a Turkish father and Swedish mother, as their second child.

Playing career

Club
Leyla began playing football at the age of five following her older brother Sami's footsteps. She entered the Turkish community's sports club Türk Anadolu FF Malmö, a mixed-gender team. She was supported by her parents, and her grandfather took Leyla to training when her parents were at work. At the age eleven, she transferred to IF Limhamn Bunkeflo. Currently, she plays in the Swedish Women's First League team FC Rosengård, which is the third club in her career.

International
After playing some time in the Sweden women's national under-17 football team,  Güngör received an invitation from the Turkish Football Federation to join the Turkey national team. Enthusiastically preferring the Turkish side, she promptly accepted. In the beginning, she communicated to the team in English, because she could not speak Turkish well but could understand it.

On September 11, 2010, she played for the first time in the Turkey U-19 national team at the 2011 UEFA Women's U-19 Championship First qualifying round – Group 9 against Romania, and scored both of the game's goals for her country.

Promoted to the Turkey women's national team in 2011, she scored the only goal for Turkey in her first appearance in the match against the Spanish side at the UEFA Women's Euro 2013 qualifying – Group 2.

References

External links

1993 births
Footballers from Malmö
Living people
Swedish people of Turkish descent
Swedish women's footballers
Turkish women's footballers
Women's association football defenders
Women's association football midfielders
FC Rosengård players
Turkey women's international footballers
Damallsvenskan players
Kristianstads DFF players
IF Limhamn Bunkeflo players